KNTR (980 AM, "Sports 980") is a radio station licensed to serve Lake Havasu City, Arizona, United States. The station is owned by Steven M. Greeley. It airs a sports radio format.

The station was assigned the KNTR call letters by the Federal Communications Commission on November 30, 1999.

Previous logo
 (KNTR's logo under previous news/talk format)

References

External links
 KNTR official website

 
 
 
 

NTR
Sports radio stations in the United States
Mass media in Mohave County, Arizona
Lake Havasu City, Arizona
Radio stations established in 1999
CBS Sports Radio stations
1999 establishments in Arizona